Melawi River is a river of north-western Borneo, Indonesia, about 900 km northeast of the capital Jakarta. It is a tributary of the Kapuas River.

The people in upper reaches of the Melawi speak Ot Danum and elsewhere along the river speak variants of the Malay language and the river banks are inhabited by the Malay and Dayak ethnic groups. A major town on the river is Nanga Pinoh, the capital of Melawi Regency.

Hydrology
The river meets the Kapuas at the town of Sintang.

Geography

The river flows in the western area of Borneo with predominantly tropical rainforest climate (designated as Af in the Köppen-Geiger climate classification). The annual average temperature in the area is 23 °C. The warmest month is May, when the average temperature is around 24 °C, and the coldest is February, at 22 °C. The average annual rainfall is 4124 mm. The wettest month is November, with an average of 523 mm rainfall, and the driest is June, with 212 mm rainfall.

See also
List of rivers of Indonesia
List of rivers of Kalimantan

References

Rivers of West Kalimantan
Rivers of Indonesia